Kerstin Heinemann (born 1942 in Tärnsjö, Västmanland County) is a Swedish Liberal People's Party politician. She was a member of the Riksdag from 1994 until 2006, and the Second Vice Speaker of the Riksdag from 2002 until 2006.

External links
Kerstin Heinemann at the Riksdag website

1942 births
21st-century Swedish women politicians
Living people
Members of the Riksdag 1994–1998
Members of the Riksdag 1998–2002
Members of the Riksdag 2002–2006
Members of the Riksdag from the Liberals (Sweden)
People from Västerås
Women members of the Riksdag